Gerald Vincent Rush (16 September 1895 – 23 December 1988) was an Australian rules footballer who played with Richmond in the Victorian Football League (VFL).

Family
The son of Roger Robert Rush (1856-1941), and Mary Rush (1856-1943), née Berry, Gerald Vincent Rush was born on 16 September 1895.

Siblings
Four of his seven brothers also played VFL football (They are the only set of five brothers to play in the VFL/AFL):
 Robert Thomas "Bob" Rush (1880–1975) (1890–1983), who played with Collingwood from 1899 to 1908.
 William Leopold "Leo" Rush (1890–1983), who played with Melbourne in 1911, and with Richmond in 1912.
 Bryan Joseph Rush (1893–1982), played with Collingwood in 1913 and 1914.
 Kevin Patrick Rush (1901–1984), played with Richmond in 1923 and 1924.

Law
He graduated Bachelor of Arts (BA) in December 1920, and Master of Arts (MA) in April 1924.  He was admitted to the Bar on 1 October 1925.

See also
 List of Australian rules football families

Footnotes

References
 Hogan P: The Tigers Of Old, Richmond FC, (Melbourne), 1996.

External links 
		

1895 births
1988 deaths
Australian rules footballers from Melbourne
Richmond Football Club players
People educated at Xavier College
People from Essendon, Victoria